Freer is a city in Duval County, Texas, United States. The population was 2,818 at the 2010 census, down from 3,241 at the 2000 census.

Geography

Freer is located in northwestern Duval County at  (27.879156, –98.616237). U.S. Route 59 passes east–west through the city as Riley Street. Once outside the city limits, US 59 leads northeast  to Beeville and southwest  to Laredo. Texas State Highway 16 (Norton Avenue) crosses US 59 in the center of town and leads north  to San Antonio and southwest  to Zapata on the Rio Grande.

Demographics

2020 census

As of the 2020 United States census, there were 2,461 people, 809 households, and 663 families residing in the city.

2000 census
As of the census of 2000, there were 3,241 people, 1,111 households, and 845 families residing in the city. The population density was 804.3 people per square mile (310.5/km2). There were 1,334 housing units at an average density of 331.1 per square mile (127.8/km2). The racial makeup of the city was 80.59% White, 0.46% African American, 0.68% Native American, 0.25% Asian, 14.87% from other races, and 3.15% from two or more races. Hispanic or Latino of any race were 77.38% of the population.

There were 1,111 households, out of which 42.0% had children under the age of 18 living with them, 56.3% were married couples living together, 14.3% had a female householder with no husband present, and 23.9% were non-families. 21.5% of all households were made up of individuals, and 9.2% had someone living alone who was 65 years of age or older. The average household size was 2.92 and the average family size was 3.40.

In the city, the population was spread out, with 33.1% under the age of 18, 9.8% from 18 to 24, 26.3% from 25 to 44, 19.9% from 45 to 64, and 10.9% who were 65 years of age or older. The median age was 30 years. For every 100 females, there were 95.9 males. For every 100 females age 18 and over, there were 96.2 males.

The median income for a household in the city was $25,078, and the median income for a family was $26,475. Males had a median income of $26,789 versus $17,159 for females. The per capita income for the city was $11,457. About 18.4% of families and 21.6% of the population were below the poverty line, including 26.5% of those under age 18 and 25.4% of those age 65 or over.

Education

The city is served by the Freer Independent School District.

Notable people

 Jim Acker, (b 1958) is a former Major League Baseball pitcher who played from 1983 to 1992 most with the Toronto Blue Jays.
 Toni Adams, (1964–2010) was a professional wrestling manager and valet who appeared in several American regional promotions during the 1980s
 Steve McMichael, (b 1957), is a former American football defensive tackle for Chicago Bears and former professional wrestler for WCW.
 Paul Sadler,(b 1955) is a attorney and Texas politician.
 Buddy Temple (D), was a (1942–2015) was a businessman and politician.

Media

KBRA-FM radio at 95.9 MHz.

Climate

The climate in this area is characterized by hot, humid summers and generally mild to cool winters.  According to the Köppen Climate Classification system, Freer has a humid subtropical climate, abbreviated "Cfa" on climate maps.

References

External links

 City of Freer official website
 Vintage Life Magazine photos

Cities in Texas
Cities in Duval County, Texas